Osman Bey may refer to:

Osman I, Ottoman Bey ( 1254–1323)
Tanburi Büyük Osman Bey (1816–1885), Ottoman composer
Osman Hamdi Bey (1842–1910), Ottoman statesman
Qara Osman ( 1378–1435), Oghuz Turkic leader
Topal Osman (1883–1923), Turkish militia leader
Osman Bey ( 1737), Ottoman Bosnian commander
Osman Adil Bey, mayor of Thessaloniki (1908)
Osman Bey (fictional character), the main protagonist of Turkish series Kuruluş: Osman